Fialka is a surname. Notable people with the surname include:
 Gerry Fialka (born 1953), American filmmaker
 Karel Fialka, Indian-born British musician
 Kazimierz Fiałka (1907–1970), Polish long-distance runner
 Ladislav Fialka (1931–1991), Czech mime
 Lukáš Fialka (born 1995), Czech footballer
 Olga Fialka (1848–1930), Austro-Hungarian artist

Czech-language surnames
Polish-language surnames